Eois versata is a moth in the  family Geometridae. It is found on Borneo and the Mentawi Islands. The habitat consists of lower montane forests.

References

Moths described in 1861
Eois
Moths of Asia